Carlo Lorenzini (24 November 1826 – 26 October 1890), better known by the pen name Carlo Collodi, was an Italian author, humourist, and journalist, widely known for his fairy tale novel The Adventures of Pinocchio.

Early life
Collodi was born in Florence on 24 November 1826. His mother, Angiolina Orzali Lorenzini, was a seamstress from Collodi, the town from which he later took the pen name, and his father, Domenico Lorenzini, was a cook. Both parents worked for the  Ginori Lisci. Carlo was the eldest child in the family and he had ten siblings but seven died at a young age. He spent most of his childhood in the town of Collodi where his mother was born. He lived there with his maternal grandmother. After attending primary school, he was sent to study at a theological seminary in Colle Val d’Elsa. An account at the seminary shows that the  had offered financial aid, but the boy found that he did not want to be a priest so he continued his education at the College of the Scolopi Fathers in Florence. In 1844 he started working at the Florentine bookstore Libreria Piatti, where he assisted Giuseppe Aiazzi, a prominent Italian manuscript specialist.

Career
During the Italian Wars of Independence in 1848 and 1860 Collodi served as a volunteer with the Tuscan army. His active interest in political matters may be seen in his earliest literary works, as well as in the founding of the satirical newspaper  in 1853. This newspaper was censored by order of the grand duke of Tuscany. In 1854, he published his second newspaper,  ("The Controversy"). Lorenzini's first publications were in his periodicals. A debut came in 1856 with the play  and parodic guidebook , both in 1856. By 1860, he published his first notable work called  (Mr. Alberi Is Right!), which outlined his political and cultural vision of Italy. This is the text where Lorenzini started using the Collodi pseudonym, which was taken from his mother's hometown.

Collodi became disenchanted with Italian politics afterward so he turned to children's literature and his first works involved translating French fairy tales into Italian. In 1875, for instance, he completed , a translation of French fairy tales by Charles Perrault.

Lorenzini became fascinated by the idea of using an amiable, rascally character as a means of expressing his own convictions through allegory. Pinocchio was adapted into a 1940 film by Disney that is considered to be one of Disney's greatest films.

Collodi died suddenly in Florence on 26 October 1890 at the age of 63 and is interred at Cimitero Monumentale Delle Porte Sante in Florence. The National Carlo Collodi Foundation was established to promote education and the works of Collodi, and the Park of Pinocchio attracts many visitors each year.

References

External links
 
 
 
 
 
 The Adventures of Pinocchio at Project Gutenberg (translated from the Italian by Carol Della Chiesa)
 
 
 Pinocchio Park  Collodi Tuscany
 New York Review of Books
 Carlo Collodi National Foundation  Collodi Tuscany
 
 Carlo Collodi and Modern Politics – Any Parallels ?
 from "Pinocchio. Le avventure di un burattino" listen to chapt.1 – 2 – 12 audio mp3 for free

1826 births
1890 deaths
Writers from Florence
Grand Duchy of Tuscany people
19th-century journalists
19th-century Italian novelists
19th-century Italian male writers
Italian male short story writers
Italian fantasy writers
Italian people of the Italian unification
Italian children's writers
Journalists from Florence
Italian male journalists
Italian male novelists
People from Pescia
People of the Revolutions of 1848
19th-century Italian short story writers
19th-century pseudonymous writers